The Geneva Convention for the Amelioration of the Condition of the Wounded and Sick in Armies in the Field, consisting of 39 articles in French, was adopted on 27 July 1929, at the end of the Diplomatic Conference of Geneva of 1929, which met from the 27 July until the 1 August of that year.

It was the third convention to address the issues of wounded and sick combatants and was preceded by the Geneva Conventions of 1864 and 1906. The 1929 convention was replaced on 12 August 1949 by the First Geneva Convention.

There were three changes in the 1929 convention, to cover areas that during World War I were found to be deficient in the 1906 convention. The provisions concerning repatriation of the seriously wounded and seriously sick prisoners were transferred to the 1929 Geneva Convention on Prisoners of War. Aircraft flying medical missions were given similar protection to that of hospital ships. In addition to the Red Cross the emblems of the Red Crescent and of the Red Lion and Sun were recognized.

References

Further reading
Full text of the Convention for the Amelioration of the Condition of the Wounded and Sick in Armies in the Field. Geneva, 27 July 1929., website of the ICRC, Retrieved 4 March 2010

Geneva Conventions
Interwar-period treaties
Treaties concluded in 1929
Treaties entered into force in 1931
1929 in Switzerland
Treaties of Argentina
Treaties extended to Australia
Treaties of the First Austrian Republic
Treaties of Belgium
Treaties of Bolivia
Treaties of Vargas-era Brazil
Treaties of the Kingdom of Bulgaria
Treaties of Canada
Treaties of Chile
Treaties of the Republic of China (1912–1949)
Treaties of Czechoslovakia
Treaties of Denmark
Treaties of the Kingdom of Egypt
Treaties of El Salvador
Treaties of Estonia
Treaties of the Ethiopian Empire
Treaties of Fiji
Treaties of Finland
Treaties of the French Third Republic
Treaties of Nazi Germany
Treaties of the Second Hellenic Republic
Treaties of the Kingdom of Hungary (1920–1946)
Treaties extended to British India
Treaties of Indonesia
Treaties of the Kingdom of Iraq
Treaties of Israel
Treaties of the Kingdom of Italy (1861–1946)
Treaties of the Empire of Japan
Treaties of Jordan
Treaties of Latvia
Treaties of Lebanon
Treaties of Liechtenstein
Treaties of Lithuania
Treaties of Mexico
Treaties of Monaco
Treaties of Myanmar
Treaties of the Netherlands
Treaties extended to New Zealand
Treaties of Norway
Treaties of the Dominion of Pakistan
Treaties of Papua New Guinea
Treaties of Peru
Treaties of the Philippines
Treaties of the Second Polish Republic
Treaties of the Ditadura Nacional
Treaties of the Kingdom of Romania
Treaties of the Soviet Union
Treaties of San Marino
Treaties of the Kingdom of Yugoslavia
Treaties of the Slovak Republic (1939–1945)
Treaties extended to the Union of South Africa
Treaties of Francoist Spain
Treaties of Sweden
Treaties of Switzerland
Treaties of the Syrian Republic (1930–1963)
Treaties of Thailand
Treaties of Turkey
Treaties of the United Kingdom
Treaties of the United States
Treaties of Venezuela